Supermercados Peruanos S.A. (Spanish: Peruvian Supermarkets) is a Peruvian second largest supermarket chain. Although its operations were concentrated around Lima at first, the chain started to expand in Peru by opening stores in Arequipa, Chiclayo, Huancayo, Callao, Ica and Trujillo.

The company was founded in 1993 after Intercorp bought Supermercados Santa Isabel Perú from Dutch multinational Ahold in 2003. The company has two denomination groups:

Supermarkets: Plaza Vea, Vivanda, Makro.
Discount stores: Mass.

History
Supermercados Peruanos S.A. started in 1993 because the international Ahold decided to sell Supermercados Santa Isabel Perú, and in the same year the Peruvian bank Interbank bought the company. Between 2006 and 2009 they started to change all Santa Isabel stores into Plaza Vea and Vivanda.

Brands

Plaza Vea 
This is the label in importance inside Supermercados Peruanos S.A., it is dedicated to people of high and medium class, the label started growing in 2001. As of January 2018 there are 103 stores in Peru.

Vivanda

Mass

Makro

External links

Supermercados Peruanos S.A. 
Plaza Vea 
Tu Entrada - System used to buy ticket for concerts, theatre, sports, etc. 

Supermarkets of Peru
Retail companies established in 1993
Peruvian brands
1993 establishments in Peru
Companies based in Lima